Roger Alexander Stead (born 18 April 1980) is an English cricketer.  Stead is a right-handed batsman who bowls right-arm medium pace.  He was born in Dewsbury, Yorkshire.

Stead made his first-class debut for Durham UCCE against Durham in 2001.  He played his second and final first-class match in the same season against Worcestershire.  In his two first-class matches, he scored 28 runs at a batting average of 14.00, with a single high score of 28.  With the ball he bowled 35 wicket-less overs.

Stead later joined Cumberland in 2007, making his Minor Counties Championship debut against Staffordshire.  He played for Cumberland in seven Minor Counties Championship and 4 MCCA Knockout Trophy to 2009, before joining Staffordshire in 2010.

He has previously played Second XI cricket for the Yorkshire Second XI.

References

External links

1980 births
Living people
Cricketers from Dewsbury
English cricketers of the 21st century
English cricketers
Durham MCCU cricketers
Cumberland cricketers
Staffordshire cricketers